Depressaria zelleri is a moth of the family Depressariidae. It is found in Italy, Romania and Turkey.

The wingspan is 25–27 mm.

References

External links
lepiforum.de

Moths described in 1879
Depressaria
Moths of Europe
Moths of Asia